The Kadzi Formation is a geological formation in Zimbabwe whose strata date back to the Tithonian stage of the Late Jurassic. The conglomeratic sandstones and silty mudstones of the formation were deposited in an alluvial environment. Dinosaur remains are among the fossils that have been recovered from the formation.

Vertebrate paleofauna 
Indeterminate brachiosaurid remains present in Mashonaland North, Zimbabwe.

See also 
 List of dinosaur-bearing rock formations
 List of fossiliferous stratigraphic units in Zimbabwe
 Mpandi Formation
 Forest Sandstone
 Gokwe Formation
 Tendaguru Formation, contemporaneous Lagerstätte of Tanzania

References

Bibliography

Further reading 
 M. A. Raath and J. S. McIntosh. 1987. Sauropod dinosaurs from the central Zambezi Valley, Zimbabwe, and the age of the Kadzi Formation. South African Journal of Geology 90(2):107-119
 N. Bertram. 1971. A New Dinosaur Fossil Locality in the Kadsi River Area of the Zambesi Valley. Mennell Society Journal (Detritus) 6:20-21
 G. Bond. 1965. Some new fossil localities in the Karroo System of Rhodesia. Arnoldia, Series of Miscellaneous Publications, National Museum of Southern Rhodesia 2(11):1-4

Geologic formations of Zimbabwe
Jurassic System of Africa
Tithonian Stage
Conglomerate formations
Sandstone formations
Mudstone formations
Alluvial deposits
Paleontology in Zimbabwe